World Championships records in the sport of track cycling are ratified by the Union Cycliste Internationale (UCI).

Men
Updated after the 2020 UCI Track Cycling World Championships

Women
Updated after the 2020 UCI Track Cycling World Championships

Notes 
 After the 2013 World Championships, the 3000m / 3 rider format was replaced by a 4000m / 4 rider format.

References

Track cycling records
UCI Track Cycling World Championships
World Championships